The 1973–74 daytime network television schedule for the three major English-language commercial broadcast networks in the United States covers the weekday and weekend daytime hours from September 1973 to August 1974. All times are Eastern and Pacific. By 1974, the networks in the Pacific Time Zone would shift to a Central Time Zone schedule altogether.

Talk shows are highlighted in  yellow, local programming is white, reruns of older programming are orange, game shows are pink, soap operas are chartreuse, news programs are gold, children's programs are light purple and sports programs are light blue. New series are highlighted in bold.

PBS, the Public Broadcasting Service, was in operation, but the schedule was set by each local station.

Monday-Friday

Note
ABC had a 6PM (ET)/5PM (CT) feed for their newscast, depending on stations' schedule.

Saturday

Sunday

By network

ABC

Returning series
ABC Evening News
The ABC Saturday Superstar Movie
All My Children
American Bandstand
The Brady Bunch 
The Brady Kids
The Bugs Bunny Show
General Hospital
The Girl in My Life
H.R. Pufnstuf 
Issues and Answers
Kid Power 
Let's Make a Deal
Love, American Style 
Make a Wish
Multiplication Rock / Grammar Rock
The Newlywed Game
One Life to Live
The Osmonds 
Password
Split Second

New series
The $10,000 Pyramid
Goober and the Ghost Chasers
Lassie's Rescue Rangers
Mission: Magic!
Super Friends
Yogi's Gang

Not returning from 1972-73
Bewitched 
The Bullwinkle Show 
Curiosity Shop 
The Dating Game
The Funky Phantom 
The Jackson 5ive
Lidsville (reruns; moved to NBC)
The Monkees

CBS

Returning series
The $10,000 Pyramid
The Amazing Chan and the Chan Clan 
As the World Turns
Camera Three
Captain Kangaroo
CBS Children's Film Festival
CBS Evening News
CBS Morning News
The Edge of Night
Everything's Archie
Face the Nation
Fat Albert and the Cosby Kids
The Flintstones Comedy Show 
Gambit
The Guiding Light
Help!... It's the Hair Bear Bunch! 
The Joker's Wild
Josie and the Pussycats 
Lamp Unto My Feet
Look Up and Live
Love of Life
Match Game
The New Scooby-Doo Movies
The Pebbles and Bamm-Bamm Show 
The Price Is Right
Sabrina the Teenage Witch 
Search for Tomorrow
The Secret Storm
Sunrise Semester
The Young and the Restless

New series
Bailey's Comets
Jeannie
My Favorite Martians
Now You See It
Speed Buggy
Tattletales

Not returning from 1972-73
Archie's Funhouse 
Archie's TV Funnies
Family Affair 
Harlem Globetrotters 
Hollywood's Talking
Josie and the Pussycats in Outer Space
Love is a Many Splendored Thing
The Vin Scully Show
Where the Heart Is

NBC

Returning series
Another World
Baffle
Days of Our Lives
Dinah's Place
The Doctors
The Hollywood Squares
Jeopardy!
The Jetsons 
Lidsville  (moved from ABC)
Meet the Press
Name That Tune
NBC Nightly News
NBC Saturday Night News
NBC Sunday Night News
The New Pink Panther Show
Return to Peyton Place
Somerset
Three on a Match
Today
The Who, What, or Where Game
The Wizard of Odds

New series
The Addams Family
Butch Cassidy and the Sundance Kids
Celebrity Sweepstakes
Emergency +4
Go!
High Rollers
How to Survive a Marriage
Inch High, Private Eye
Jackpot
Sigmund and the Sea Monsters
Star Trek: The Animated Series
Winning Streak

Not returning from 1972-73
Around the World in 80 Days
The Barkleys
Concentration (continued in syndication)
The Houndcats
The Roman Holidays
Runaround
Sale of the Century (returned in 1982-83)
Sealab 2020

See also
1973-74 United States network television schedule (prime-time)
1973-74 United States network television schedule (late night)

United States weekday network television schedules
1973 in American television
1974 in American television